NGC 595 is an H II region in the Triangulum Galaxy. It was discovered by Heinrich Ludwig d'Arrest on October 1, 1864.

References

External links
 
 

NGC 0595
NGC 0595
0595
Triangulum Galaxy
18641001
Star-forming regions